The North Wales Coast West Football League is a football league in Wales, at tiers 4 and 5 of the Welsh football league system in North Wales, founded in 2020. The league is under the control of the North Wales Coast Football Association. The league replaced the former Gwynedd League and Anglesey Leagues, and covers the North West of Wales. A corresponding North Wales Coast East Football League will be also be established at the same time.

League history
Plans for the new league were discussed in March 2020. There were to be two tiers - the Premier Division – with no more than 16 clubs, at tier 4, with Division One – with no more than 16 clubs, at tier 5.

Member clubs for 2022–23 season

Premier League

Aberffraw
Amlwch Town
Bethesda Athletic

Glantraeth
Gwalchmai
Llanberis
Llannerch-Y-Medd
Llanrug United
Menai Bridge Tigers
Mynydd Llandegai
Nefyn United
Penrhyndeudraeth
Pentraeth
Pwllheli
Talysarn Celts

Division One

Arriva Bangor 
Bethesda Rovers
Bontnewydd
Caergybi
Cefni
Cemaes Bay
Gaerwen
Holyhead Town
Llanfairpwll
Llangoed
Llanystumdwy
Mountain Rangers
Trearddur Bay
Y Fali

Premier League Champions

2020s

2020-21: – Competition not played – Covid-19 pandemic
2021-22: – Bodedern Athletic

Division One Champions

2020s

2020-21: – Competition not played – Covid-19 pandemic
2021-22: – Llannerch-Y-Medd

Cup Competitions

2020s

2020-21: Season void
2021-22: 
Premier Division: –
Division One: –

References

External links 
North Wales Coast Football Association

Sport in Anglesey
Wales
Wales
2020 establishments in Wales
Sports leagues established in 2020
Sport in Gwynedd